South Hill is a census-designated place (CDP) in Pierce County, Washington, immediately south of Puyallup. The population was 64,708 at time of the 2020 census, up from 52,431 in 2010. The area primarily consists of suburban housing and shopping with several retail shopping centers, residential neighborhoods, and apartment/condo complexes throughout. 

Most commercial areas are located along the main thoroughfare, Meridian Avenue (SR161). Major neighborhoods include Manorwood, Sunrise (Sunrise Master Association), Lipoma Firs, Silvercreek, and Gem Heights. There are also a few popular public parks: Bradley Lake Park, South Hill Community Park/Nathan Chapman Memorial Trail and Wildwood Park.

The area was first settled in the 1880s after a military road was built through the area in the 1850s. Several logging camps, farms, and hunting grounds sprouted up as the area was settled. It also was the main route to the towns of Kapowsin and Eatonville (Meridian Avenue or SR 161). Population growth was slow until after World War II, when roads improved and people could commute to nearby Tacoma, Fort Lewis, and Seattle.

Geography
South Hill is located at  (47.121080, -122.290506).

The community's name describes its location above the south side of the Puyallup River valley. This also contrasts with the nearby Edgewood and Milton areas, which are known informally as North Hill.

According to the United States Census Bureau, the CDP has a total area of 18.1 square miles (46.8 km2), of which, 18.0 square miles (46.6 km2) of it is land and 0.1 square miles (0.2 km2) of it (0.39%) is water.

Climate

Demographics

As of the census of 2000, there were 31,623 people, 10,929 households, and 8,721 families residing in the CDP. The population density was 1,756.3 people per square mile (677.9/km2). There were 11,398 housing units at an average density of 633.0/sq mi (244.4/km2). The racial makeup of the CDP was 87.41% White, 2.42% African American, 0.94% Native American, 3.36% Asian, 0.49% Pacific Islander, 1.45% from other races, and 3.94% from two or more races. Hispanic or Latino of any race were 4.13% of the population.

There were 10,929 households, out of which 45.7% had children under the age of 18 living with them, 65.3% were married couples living together, 9.8% had a female householder with no husband present, and 20.2% were non-families. 15.1% of all households were made up of individuals, and 4.4% had someone living alone who was 65 years of age or older. The average household size was 2.89 and the average family size was 3.20.

In the CDP, the age distribution of the population shows 31.3% under the age of 18, 7.6% from 18 to 24, 33.9% from 25 to 44, 20.4% from 45 to 64, and 6.9% who were 65 years of age or older. The median age was 33 years. For every 100 females, there were 97.4 males. For every 100 females age 18 and over, there were 93.8 males.

The median income for a household in the CDP was $60,524, and the median income for a family was $64,544. Males had a median income of $45,637 versus $30,306 for females. The per capita income for the CDP was $22,700. About 2.6% of families and 4.2% of the population were below the poverty line, including 4.6% of those under age 18 and 3.2% of those age 65 or over.

2010 Census

As of the census of 2010, there were 52,431 people, 17,962 households, and 13,990 families residing in the CDP. There were 19,081 housing. The racial makeup of the CDP was 78.2% White, 4.3% African American, 1.0% Native American, 6.0% Asian, 1.1% Pacific Islander, 3.1% from other races, and 6.5% from two or more races. Hispanic or Latino of any race were 8.5% of the population.

There were 17,962 households, out of which 45.7% had children under the age of 18 living with them, 60.6% were married couples living together, 11.7% had a female householder with no husband present, and 22.1% were non-families. 16.1% of all households were made up of individuals, and 4.9% had someone living alone who was 65 years of age or older. The average household size was 2.92 and the average family size was 3.25.

In the CDP, the age distribution of the population shows 29.7% under the age of 18, 70.3% over the age of 18, and 7.7% who were 65 years of age or older. The median age was 33.6 years.

2009–2013 American Community Survey

According to the 2013 American Community Survey Estimates, the median income for a household in the CDP was $72,789, and the median income for a family was $87,874. Males had a median income of $59,965 versus $41,749 for females. The per capita income for the CDP was $28,201. About 6.1% of families and 8.4% of the population were below the poverty line.

Education

The Puyallup School District is the public school district for South Hill. Governor John R. Rogers High School and Emerald Ridge High School are both located in South Hill, as well as three junior high schools: Glacier View Junior High, Stahl Junior High, and Ballou Junior High, and several elementary schools. Elementary schools include Hunt Elementary, Edgerton Elementary, Carson Elementary, Pope Elementary, Brouillet Elementary, Firgrove Elementary, Zeiger Elementary, Ridgecrest Elementary, and Dessie F. Evans Elementary.

History
South Hill Historical Society gathers data and memories on the history of South Hill.

Major events
 1853- Longmire-Biles wagon train crosses South Hill
 1870- South Hill inhabited
 1895- Firgrove School District is established
 1905- Main route through South Hill named Ball-Wood Road
 1909- Tacoma-Puyallup Interurban Line rail operates through South Hill
 1930- SagMiller Airstrip opens
 1944- Thun Field opens (Pierce County Airport today), although John Thun doesn't buy it until 1949
 1945- Japan uses balloon bomb system to bomb mainland USA in World War II, and two of the bombs landed in South Hill 
 1950- Firgrove School District consolidates with Puyallup School District
 1972- State Route 512 is completed
 1986- EPA places Pierce County Landfill in South Hill on the National Priorities List 
 1998- Proposal for South Hill's incorporation into Southview is defeated by voters

Parks and recreation
South Hill is home to three major parks owned and operated by Pierce County.

Heritage Recreation Center is a 40-acre sports complex with baseball fields, soccer fields, and multi-purpose fields located between Rogers High School and Zeiger Elementary School.

South Hill Community Park is a 40-acre park with a playground, two soccer fields, and both the South Hill Loop Trail and the Nathan Chapman Memorial Trail, a 1.6 mile paved pathway through forest and wetlands that connects the park to the Heritage Recreation Center. According to the Pierce County website, the Nathan Chapman Memorial Trail was named after Sgt. Nathan Chapman, a South Hill resident and the first American soldier to die in the war in Afghanistan.

Meridian Habitat Park & Community Center is a 36-acre park located on State Route 161. The site was previously an amphitheatre owned by Champion Center Church and home to the annual Jesus of Nazareth passion play from 1982 to 2006. The church sold the amphitheatre to Pierce County for $6.9 million in 2006, but the stage caught fire and was destroyed by an electric fire in 2007.

Bradley Lake Park and Wildwood Park are within the city limits of Puyallup.

Surrounding community

Notable people
 Sgt. Nathan Chapman - First American soldier to die in the war in Afghanistan
 Megan Jendrick - Two-time Olympic gold medalist swimmer
 Melanie Stambaugh - Elected to the Washington state House of Representatives in November 2014
 Brandon Gibson - Rogers High school graduate, notable football and basketball player at Washington State University. Sixth-round draft pick in the 2009 NFL Draft.

References

External links
South Hill Historical Society

Census-designated places in Pierce County, Washington
Census-designated places in Washington (state)